Polygala kuriensis is a species of plant in the family Polygalaceae. It is endemic to Yemen, where it is found on the island of Socotra.  Its natural habitats are subtropical or tropical dry shrubland and rocky areas.

References

kuriensis
Endemic flora of Socotra
Threatened flora of Asia
Vulnerable plants
Taxonomy articles created by Polbot